Edward Alleyn (1566–1626) was an English actor.

Edward Alleyn may also refer to:

Edward Alleyn (Massachusetts politician), early American politician
Sir Edward Alleyn, 1st Baronet of the Alleyn baronets

See also
Edward Allen (disambiguation)